Cuddy (formerly Cuddy Hill, Morgan and Morgan Hill) is an unincorporated community in Allegheny County, Pennsylvania, United States. The community is served by the South Fayette Volunteer Fire Department. Cuddy has a post office, with the zip code 15031. The mayor is Michael Condupa.

References

Unincorporated communities in Allegheny County, Pennsylvania
Unincorporated communities in Pennsylvania